John Evans-Freke, 6th Baron Carbery (11 November 1765 – 12 May 1845), known as Sir John Evans-Freke, 2nd Baronet between 1777 and 1807, was an Anglo-Irish politician and peer.

He was the son of Sir John Freke, 1st Baronet. In 1777 he succeeded to his father's baronetcy. He served in the Irish House of Commons as the Member of Parliament for Donegal Borough between 1783 and 1790. He then represented Baltimore from 1790 to 1800. On 4 March 1807 he succeeded his first cousin once removed, John Evans, as Baron Carbery, and in 1824 was elected to the House of Lords as an Irish representative peer.

On 25 January 1783, he married his cousin, Lady Catherine Charlotte Gore, the third daughter of Arthur Gore, 2nd Earl of Arran. He died without surviving male issue, and was succeeded in his titles by his nephew, George Evans-Freke.

References

|-

1765 births
1845 deaths
18th-century Anglo-Irish people
19th-century Anglo-Irish people
Barons Carbery
Irish MPs 1783–1790
Irish MPs 1790–1797
Irish MPs 1798–1800
Irish representative peers
Members of the Parliament of Ireland (pre-1801) for County Donegal constituencies
Members of the Parliament of Ireland (pre-1801) for County Cork constituencies